Bakhri is a village in West Champaran district in the Indian state of Bihar.

Demographics
 India census, Bakhri had a population of 991 in 174 households. Males constitute 54.28% of the population and females 45.71%. Bakhri has an average literacy rate of 51.96%, lower than the national average of 74%: male literacy is 50.88%, and female literacy is 49.11%. In Bakhri, 18.76% of the population is under 6 years of age.

References

Villages in West Champaran district